{{DISPLAYTITLE:C20H30O3}} 
The molecular formula C20H30O3 may refer to:

 Dihydrotestosterone formate
 Eoxin A4
 Galanolactone
 Leukotriene A4
 9-Nor-9β-hydroxyhexahydrocannabinol
 Neotripterifordin
 5-oxo-eicosatetraenoic acid
 Oxymesterone
 Steviol